Nguyễn Hương Giang (born 29 December 1991) is a Vietnamese beauty queen transgender, model and singer. In March 2018, she won the Miss International Queen 2018  transgender beauty pageant held in Pattaya, Thailand.

Early life 
Huong Giang was born in Hanoi on 29 December 1992. She had a tough childhood and used to struggle with dressing and talking like a girl as her community did not accept her. She is now one of the most successful Vietnamese pop singers, having entered the list of most popular pop singers.

She is best known as the first transgender singer to participate in the fourth season of Vietnam Idol, which contributed to her fame, similar to contestant Phuong Vy. She was the first transgender person to represent Vietnam at Miss International Queen in 2018. In 2014, she was a contestant on The Amazing Race Vietnam with her boyfriend, Criss Lai.

References 
The information in this article is based on that in its Vietnamese equivalent.

External links 
 
 
 
 

1991 births
Living people
Vietnamese singers
Vietnamese female models
Transgender women
Vietnamese women singers